Fabrício Almeida Carvalho, known as Lobão (born 21 June 1972) is a former Brazilian football player. He also holds Portuguese citizenship.

Club career
He made his Primeira Liga debut for Beira-Mar on 21 August 1998 in a game against Braga.

Honours
Beira-Mar
Taça de Portugal: 1998–99

References

External links
 

1972 births
Sportspeople from Minas Gerais
Living people
Brazilian footballers
Esporte Clube Democrata players
S.C. Beira-Mar players
Brazilian expatriate footballers
Expatriate footballers in Portugal
Liga Portugal 2 players
Primeira Liga players
Sociedade Esportiva e Recreativa Caxias do Sul players
C.D. Aves players
Cerezo Osaka players
Expatriate footballers in Japan
J1 League players
Operário Futebol Clube (MS) players
Association football defenders